The Postgraduate School for Environmental Studies (or ASA) is a high school education of the Università Cattolica del Sacro Cuore specializing in issues concerning environmental issues and the economic, cultural and social changes. The school, founded in 2008, is headquartered in Brescia.

Master's degrees
ASA offers two master's degrees:
Human Development and environment. Governance, Education, Scientific Knowledge
Food management and green marketing

References

External links
  

Università Cattolica del Sacro Cuore
Graduate schools in Italy
Environmental studies institutions in Italy
Universities and colleges in Lombardy
Education in Brescia
Buildings and structures in Brescia
Educational institutions established in 2008
2008 establishments in Italy